Gourmya gourmyi, common name the gourmya cerith, is a species of sea snail, a marine gastropod mollusk in the family Cerithiidae.

Description
The shell size varies between 30 mm and 75 mm.

Distribution
This species is distributed in the Pacific Ocean along New Caledonia and the New Hebrides.

References

External links
 Houbrick R. S. (1981). "Anatomy and systematics of Gourmya gourmyi (Prosobranchia: Cerithiidae), a Tethyan relict from the southwest Pacific". The Nautilus 95(1): 2–11.
 

Cerithiidae
Gastropods described in 1861